Legend of Earthsea (later shortened to Earthsea) is a two-part television fantasy miniseries produced for the Sci-Fi Channel. It is an adaptation of the Earthsea novels by Ursula K. Le Guin. The teleplay was written by Gavin Scott, and the series was directed by Robert Lieberman. It was an American-Canadian co-production, filmed on-location in Vancouver, British Columbia.

Combining the plots of the first and second novels, the story follows Ged (Shawn Ashmore), a powerful but reckless mage-in-training, and Tenar (Kristin Kreuk), a young priestess, who are drawn together in a battle against the ancient race of demons known as the Nameless Ones. The cast also features Danny Glover, Isabella Rossellini, Sebastian Roché and Chris Gauthier.

The series aired over two consecutive nights in December 2004, and received generally negative reviews from both critics and fans of the original novel, and was heavily criticized for its numerous deviations from the source material. However, it won seven Leo Awards and was nominated for a Primetime Emmy Award for Outstanding Special Visual Effects. Le Guin stated in interviews that she had been cut out of the creative process, and subsequently disowned the series.

Plot 
In the land of Earthsea, a young wizard named Ged has visions about a girl and doors opening. Meanwhile, King Tygath wants to rule the land and release the Nameless Ones, demons from whom he hopes to learn the secret of immortality. He sends men to attack Ged's village, in search of the wizard of prophecy (Ged). Ged learns his first spell from an elderly woman. When the invasion comes, Ged uses a mist spell and lures the invaders over a cliff, saving the village. However, Ged also falls off the cliff.

Tygath tries to convince High Priestess Thar to release the Nameless Ones, but she refuses. She is poisoned by Rosa, her attendant who has been tricked by the king's lover, Kossil, every time she has tea.

A magus named Ogion arrives at Ged's village and revives Ged. He tells Ged his true name and takes him for training, but Ged is too impatient; he is sent to the magic school on Roke. There he meets the bully, Jasper, and befriends a student named Vetch. Ged shapeshifts into a hawk to show off. Jasper then challenges him to raise a spirit from the dead, leading him to accidentally release a Nameless One. The demon attacks Ged before being driven away by the Archmagus, who tells him that this Nameless One will hunt Ged down and try to possess him, using Ged's power for further destruction. Ged must go somewhere in hiding until he can find its true name and destroy it.

With the help of Jasper, King Tygath takes control of the magic school. He throws a knife at the Archmagus, apparently killing him and making Jasper the new Archmagus.

With the help of Ogion, Ged confronts the Gebbeth and attempts to drown him using a rock, however, it escapes with Ged's likeness and voice. Ged's impersonator becomes a murderer, and Vetch, a magus himself, chases Ged until he realizes Ged is not possessed by the Gebbeth and they decide to hunt it together.

They are attacked by the dragon, Orm Embar, but Ged uses the dragon's true name to bind him and ask three questions. He wastes his first question, but with his second, he learns the Gebbeth's location. The dragon tells him where to find the two pieces of the Amulet of Peace, which when reunited would save Earthsea, but Ged could have asked the true name of the demon.

Meanwhile, Thar appoints a successor, Tenar, and tells her the incantation to release the Nameless Ones. Kossil strangles Rosa and frames Tenar, leading to her imprisonment.

Ged and Vetch return to Roke for help in decoding the dragon's riddle. The Archmagus survived Tygath's attack and made the real Jasper into a village fool as punishment. He sends Ged and Vetch to unseal the Nameless Tombs on Atuan, but Ged is captured and brought before Thar, who mistakes him for an evil wizard.

In the labyrinth, Ged is locked in the cell next to Tenar. They break free and recognize each other from their visions. Thar realizes her mistake right before her death. Kossil tries to force Tenar to reveal the incantation and fails, so Tygath kills Kossil and follows Tenar to the gate of the Nameless Ones.

Vetch finds the tomb first and is taken by the Gebbeth. Ged encounters Tygath in the labyrinth and fights him but then escapes into the tomb. He encounters the Gebbeth and realizes its true name is his own, because it is the darkness in himself. The demon is absorbed into Ged, making him whole again and strengthening him to strike Tygath in the tomb. Tygath threatens Tenar to release the Nameless Ones, but she refuses, remaining true to her faith.  Ged then requests Tenar to go ahead and release them.  He tells her to look into his eyes, in trust.  She recites the incantation, releasing the Nameless Ones.  The Nameless Ones, then, take Tygath into the sky before flying off. Ged reveals part of the key is the second half of the amulet. The Amulet of Peace is made whole, dispelling the Nameless Ones with a bright light and restoring peace to Earthsea. Ged is seen victorious with Tenar and they kiss.

Cast

Main characters

Supporting characters

Production 
The series was produced by Hallmark Entertainment in association with Bender-Brown Productions. It was adapted by Gavin Scott (The Mists of Avalon) from the Earthsea novels for executive producers Robert Halmi, Sr. (Merlin, Gulliver's Travels, Animal Farm), Lawrence Bender (Kill Bill, Pulp Fiction) and Kevin Kelly Brown (Roswell).

The series was filmed in Vancouver, British Columbia, Canada.

Critical reception 
Reviewing the miniseries, the book  The Ultimate Encyclopedia of Fantasy claimed Legend of Earthsea "totally missed the point" of Le Guin's novels, "ripping out all the subtlety, nuance and beauty of the books and inserting boring cliches, painful stereotypes and a very unwelcome 'epic' war in their place". The Moria website's review of "Legend of Earthsea" states "Earthsea feels exactly like tv filler. In the books, Ursula Le Guin expended a great deal of time creating a world with a depth and culture, but nothing of this survives in the mini-series". The review also argues Legend of Earthsea "is shabbily and indifferently directed" and "The dialogue is dreadfully clunky and often excruciatingly bad".

Author's response 
Le Guin, author of the novels on which the miniseries is based, was not involved in the development of the material or the making of the production. She has written a number of responses to the handling of this adaptation of her works, "A Whitewashed Earthsea" and "Frankenstein's Earthsea." She noted, "When I sold the rights to Earthsea a few years ago, my contract gave me the standard status of "consultant"—which means whatever the producers want it to mean, almost always little or nothing," and that, "Mr. Lieberman, one of the producers, published a statement telling people what 'Ursula' (whom he has never met) 'intended' by the books. That changed the situation. They were taking advantage of my silence by sticking words in my mouth. I put a reply on my website...."

References

External links 

 
 Ursula K. Le Guin: Earthsea
  Requires blocking with cursor to be made visible.
 
 
 

Adaptations of works by Ursula K. Le Guin
High fantasy television series
2000s American television miniseries
2000s Canadian television miniseries
Earthsea
English-language Canadian films
Syfy original programming
Television shows based on American novels
Sonar Entertainment miniseries
Television shows filmed in Vancouver